Liaqat may refer to:

Agha Syed Liaqat Ali, Pakistani politician, member of the Provincial Assembly of Balochistan 2013–2018
Chaudhry Liaqat Ali, Pakistani politician, member of the Provincial Assembly of the Punjab since 2018
Liaqat Ali (1895–1951),  the first Prime Minister of Pakistan
Liaqat Ali (cricketer, born 1955) (born 1955), Pakistani cricketer
Rana Liaqat Ali, Pakistani politician, Member of the Provincial Assembly of the Punjab since 2018
Liaqat Baloch (born 1952), political leader in Pakistan
Liaqat Ali Bangulzai, Pakistani politician
Liaqat Abbas Bhatti, Pakistani politician
Iffat Liaqat Ali Khan, Pakistani politician in the Provincial Assembly of Punjab
Liaqat Ali Khan (Pakistani politician), Pakistani politician, member of the Provincial Assembly of Khyber Pakhtunkhwa since 2018
Liaqat Ali Khan (politician), Pakistani politician, member of the National Assembly of Pakistan 2008–2013
Liaqat Hayat Khan KCIE OBE (1887–1948), Indian official, Prime Minister of Patiala State, in British India
Iffat Liaqat, Pakistani politician, member of the National Assembly of Pakistan 2013–2018
Mani Liaqat (born 1984), Manchester-based British-Asian actor and comedian
Mohammed Liaqat, one of the leaders of a child sex abuse ring that sexually abused up to a hundred girls in Derby, England
Sajid Liaqat (born 1985), German cricketer
Hafiz Liaqat Manzoor, citizen of Pakistan who was held in the Guantanamo Bay detention camps in Cuba
Liaqat Khan Tarakai, Pakistani politician, member of Senate of Pakistan representing Pakistan Tehreek-e-Insaf

See also
Liaqat Ali (disambiguation)
Liaqat National Bagh, famous park on Murree Road in the city of Rawalpindi, Punjab, Pakistan
Tolombeh-ye Mohandas Liaqat, village in Mohammadabad Rural District, Marvdasht County, Fars Province, Iran
Liaqat Pur, city and capital of Liaqatpur Tehsil in Rahim Yar Khan District, Punjab, Pakistan
Liaquat (disambiguation)